According to the 2011 Romanian census, 2,543 Poles live in Romania, mainly in the villages of Suceava County. There are three exclusively Polish villages, as follows: Nowy Sołoniec (Solonețu Nou), Plesza (Pleșa), and Pojana Mikuli (Poiana Micului), as well a significant Polish presence in Kaczyca (Cacica) and Paltynosa (Păltinoasa). There is also a relatively sizable number of ethnic Poles living in the county seat, Suceava.

Poles in Romania form an officially recognised national minority, having one seat in the Chamber of Deputies (currently held by the Union of Poles of Romania) and access to Polish elementary schools and cultural centres (known as "Polish Houses" or "Dom Polski" in Polish).

History 

The first Poles settled in Moldavia in the times of Casimir III (specifically during the Late Middle Ages). Most of the Poles immigrating after 1774 were looking for work. So it was that Polish miners from Bochnia and Wieliczka were brought to salt mines in Cacica.

Another wave of Polish immigration arrived in Bukovina in the early 19th century, when the region was a crownland of the Austro-Hungarian Empire, as was a significant portion of present-day southern Poland (see: Kingdom of Galicia and Lodomeria).

Around 1803, Polish highlanders from Čadca settled in Treblecz (Tereblecea, now in Chernivtsi Raion, Chernivtsi Oblast, Ukraine) by Siret, in Stara Huta Krasna and in Kaliczanka and again in 1814 to 1819, this time settling in Hliboka (Adâncata) and Tereszna. Nowy Sołoniec was settled in 1834, Plesza in 1835, and Pojana Mikuli in 1842.

At that time, it must be mentioned that Bukovina was a very attractive region of the Austrian Empire to live in thanks to Austria's policy not to conscript recruits into its army from there (service in the Austrian army at that time was for a 14-year term).

Furthermore, Bukovina was free from serfdom, primarily attracting immigrants of German (who later formed the basis of the Bukovina German community of the region), Jewish, and also Czecho-Slovak origin but also Polish ethnicity and even Russian and Italian.

There were probably other waves of migration from Poland after the November and Kraków Uprisings, but most Poles were from peasant families relocated there by the Empire's authorities after they participated in the Jakub Szela insurrection.

Communes with the highest Polish population percentage 

 Suceava County
 Cacica — 20.04%
 Mănăstirea Humorului — 19.3%
 Mușenița — 4.06%
 Moara — 3.23%
 Păltinoasa — 1.14%

Notable Polish Romanians 

 Marian Kielec, footballer
 Corneliu Zelea Codreanu, politician, founder of the Iron Guard
 Ioan Gyuri Pascu (partly Polish), musician, actor, and comedian
 Octavian Smigelschi (partly Polish), painter
 Stefan Norris (born in Poland; subsequently settled in Romania), art director
 Mărgărita Miller-Verghy, author, journalist, critic, and translator
 Wojciech Weiss, painter
 Leonard Mociulschi, major general
 Henri Cihoski, lieutenant-general
 Robert Sadowski, international footballer
 Michał Belina Czechowski, Seventh-Day Adventist preacher
 Ghervazen Longher, politician
 Adolf Zytogorski (born in Romania; moved to Poland then England), chess master and translator
 Tytus Czerkawski, politician
 Izydor Kopernicki, physician
 Iosif Malinovski, Roman Catholic vicar and publisher
 Gustaw Otręba, physician
 Witold Rola Piekarski, cartoonist and academic
 Feliks Wierciński, Roman Catholic priest and schoolteacher

Gallery

See also 

 Polish–Romanian alliance
 Romanian Bridgehead
 Poland-Romania relations
 Polonia Cernăuți
 Poles in Moldova
 Poles in Hungary
 Polish diaspora

References

External links 

 Map of Polish villages in Romania
  Polonia w Rumunii
  Polscy uchodźcy w Rumunii 1939–1947. Dokumenty z Narodowych Archiwów Rumunii / Refugiații polonezi în România 1939–1947. Documente din Arhivele Naționale ale României, t. 1, cz. 1 i 2*The Polish organization in Romania 
 Polish minority in Cacica - Romania (archive)

 
Bukovina
Ethnic groups in Romania
Romania
 
Minority